University of Global Village (UGV) is a private university in Barishal, Bangladesh. The main campus is at 874/322 C&B Road, Barishal Sadar, Barishal. The University Grants Commission approved the institution in 2016. The university offers degrees in engineering, agriculture, arts, business and science.

The chancellor of the university, President Abdul Hamid, appointed Jahangir Alam Khan as the new vice chancellor for four years on 14 November 2018.

References

External links
Official website

Private universities in Bangladesh
Educational institutions established in 2017
Education in Barisal
2017 establishments in Bangladesh